Pa Sang is a district (amphoe) of Lamphun province, northern Thailand.

Geography
Neighboring districts are (from the east clockwise) Mueang Lamphun, Mae Tha, Ban Hong and Wiang Nong Long of Lamphun Province, Doi Lo and San Pa Tong of Chiang Mai province.

History
Originally named Pak Bong after its central sub-district, the district was renamed Pa Sang in 1953.

Ethnic groups
The district is home to a population of Yong people. They migrated from Muang Yong of Shan State of today's Myanmar to the northern part of Thailand in 1805 or in the early-Rattanakosin period. Yong women are known as skillful cloth weavers.

Administration

Central administration 
Pa Sang district is divided into nine sub-districts (tambons), which are further subdivided into 90 administrative villages (mubans).

Missing numbers are tambons which now form Wiang Nong Long District.

Local administration 
There are four sub-district municipalities (thesaban tambons) in the district:
 Pa Sang consisting of sub-districts Pak Bong, Pa Sang.
 Muang Noi consisting of sub-district Muang Noi.
 Mae Raeng consisting of sub-district Mae Raeng.
 Makok consisting of sub-district Makok.

There are four sub-district administrative organizations (SAO) in the district:
 Ban Ruean consisting of sub-district Ban Ruean.
 Tha Tum consisting of sub-district Tha Tum.
 Nam Dip consisting of sub-district Nam Dip.
 Nakhon Chedi consisting of sub-district Nakhon Chedi.

References

External links
amphoe.com (Thai)

Pa Sang